Viarmes is a railway station in Viarmes (Val d'Oise department), France. The station is served by the Transilien H trains from Paris to Luzarches. In 2002 fewer than 500 passengers per day joined a train here.

Bus routes
CIF: 14 and 141

References

External links
 

Railway stations in Val-d'Oise
Railway stations in France opened in 1880